Statistics of association football in Switzerland during the 1903–04 season.

East

Central

Play-off

|}

West

Final

Table

Results 

|colspan="3" style="background-color:#D0D0D0" align=center|27 March 1904

|-
|colspan="3" style="background-color:#D0D0D0" align=center|10 April 1904

|-
|colspan="3" style="background-color:#D0D0D0" align=center|17 April 1904

|}

FC St. Gallen won the championship.

Sources 
 Switzerland 1903-04 at RSSSF

Seasons in Swiss football 
Swiss Football League seasons
1903–04 in Swiss football
Swiss